The 2004 FIVB Volleyball World League was the 15th edition of the annual men's international volleyball tournament, played by 12 countries from 4 June to 18 July 2004. The Final Round was held in Rome, Italy.

Pools composition

Intercontinental round
The Final Round hosts Italy, the winners of each pool and a wild card chosen by the FIVB will qualify for the Final Round. If Italy are ranked first in Pool C, the team ranked second of Pool C will qualify for the Final Round.

Pool A

|}

|}

Pool B

|}

|}

Pool C

|}

|}

Final round
Venue:  PalaLottomatica, Rome, Italy
All times are Central European Summer Time (UTC+02:00).

First final round

|}

Final four

Semifinals

|}

3rd place match

|}

Final

|}

Final standing

Awards
Best Scorer (Most Valuable Player)
  Andrea Sartoretti
Best Spiker
  Samuele Papi
Best Blocker
  Luigi Mastrangelo
Best Server
  Matey Kaziyski

References

External links
Official website

FIVB Volleyball World League
FIVB World League
Volleyball
2004 in Italian sport